Seyedeh Khadijeh Aryan (born 11 October 1954) is an Iranian Scholar and currently the Vice President of the Iranian Counselling Association. She was the Secretary General of ISESCO, Head of Bureau for assisting education in Afghanistan and visiting fellow in Institute of Education.

Personal life and education

Khadijeh is a holder of degrees from Allameh Tabatabaee University and Hofstra University in the United States.

References

Living people
1954 births
Iranian scholars
Hofstra University alumni
People from Rasht